The Cenotaph is a war memorial on Heerengracht Street in Cape Town. The city's annual Remembrance Day ceremonies are held there. It is classified as a public memorial and as such is subject to protection in terms of heritage legislation administered by Heritage Western Cape, the provincial heritage resources authority of the Western Cape province of South Africa.

Purpose
First unveiled in 1924 to commemorate soldiers who died in World War I, it also commemorates soldiers who subsequently died in World War II and the Korean War. The City of Cape Town holds Remembrance Day ceremonies at the Cenotaph annually at 11am on the Sunday closest to 11 November. The wreath laying ceremonies include the wearing of red remembrance poppies, the "Last Post" bugle call and the observation of a two-minute silence.

The Cenotaph was unveiled on 3 August 1924 by South Africa's then Governor-General Alexander Cambridge, 1st Earl of Athlone, who said:

Design
The memorial was designed by English sculptor Vernon March and comprises two bronze figures of soldiers in action on separate sandstone columns, one on either side of a tall central sandstone column supporting a bronze winged victory figure. One of the flanking soldier figures depicts South Africans in World War I who fought in the East African Campaign and the other depicts those who fought in the Western Front. The winged victory figure, modelled on the Winged Victory of Samothrace, faces Table Mountain holding a laurel wreath high and treading on a serpent wrapped around a globe. Four bronze plaques at its base depict various battle scenes, including a trench scene of the Battle of Delville Wood, an artillery scene, an aircraft scene and a hospital scene. Inscriptions on the memorial are written in English and Afrikaans. The memorial stands on a square granite base.

The design of the memorial is similar to that of the Diamond War Memorial erected in Derry, Northern Ireland in 1927, which was also designed by March.

Location
The Cenotaph is located on the Heerengracht Street median at the street's intersection with Herzog Boulevard in Cape Town's city centre, on the city's main boulevard. It has been relocated twice to facilitate development of the city's transport infrastructure, in 1959 and 2013. It was first erected at the bottom of Adderley Street in 1924. In 1959 it was moved by  when Adderley Street was widened.

See also
Artillery Memorial, Cape Town
Delville Wood South African National Memorial

References

Further reading

External links

University of Cape Town Libraries – Memorial in Adderley Street to temporarily move to the Grand Parade, Cape Town, 22/08/1956

1924 establishments in South Africa
Buildings and structures completed in 1924
Monuments and memorials in South Africa
Cape Town
Korean War memorials and cemeteries
South African military memorials and cemeteries
World War I memorials
World War II memorials
1924 sculptures
Sculptures by Vernon March
Bronze sculptures in South Africa
Statues in South Africa
20th-century architecture in South Africa